Mike Danzi (September 1, 1898, New York City - February 13, 1986, New York City) was an American jazz and light music banjoist, guitarist, and bandleader.

Danzi was the son of Italian immigrants; his father, Domenico Danzi, had come to the US in 1892. played violin early in his career, including as the leader of an early jazz group called the Red Devils Jazz Band. In 1921, he switched to playing banjo and worked as a vaudeville performer. As a member of Wilbur Sweatman's orchestra in 1924, he played alongside Duke Ellington; later that year he began playing with Alex Hyde's band, which toured Europe in 1924-1925. Instead of returning with the band, he remained in Germany for the next fourteen years, playing with Bernard Etté, Harry Revel and Dajos Béla as well as with his own group, The Virginians, which he founded in 1929 and was formally led by Teddy Kline (de). He worked in Germany through the 1930s, even though the Nazis condemned jazz music and it became less palatable for Italians to live in Germany after Benito Mussolini's rise to power. He played in the orchestra at La Scala under Otto Stenzel (de) in 1935, and worked on German radio and with light-music orchestras; in 1938 he made a few early television appearances with Otto Sachsenhauser. In October 1939, he had an altercation at the doorman of UFA Film Studios when he refused to carry out the Hitler salute, and he left Germany to return to the United States a few days later. He continued his career in the United States, playing at Radio City Music Hall in 1956.

References
"Mike Danzi". The New Grove Dictionary of Jazz. 2nd edition, ed. Barry Kernfeld.

American jazz banjoists
American jazz guitarists
American jazz bandleaders
1898 births
1986 deaths
Guitarists from New York City
Jazz musicians from New York (state)
20th-century guitarists